Hard Copy is a South African television drama series created by Anton Harber, Malcolm Purkey and Jann Turner which follows the fortunes of the staff of a fictional newspaper which - due to the economic pressures of the times - finds itself on the media cusp between delivering news and sensationalism, before changing identity completely in Season 3 and becoming a tabloid.

Plot 
This is the life of the staff and owners of The Bulletin, a South African newspaper that finds itself on the media cusp between delivering news and sensationalism. When editors and their journalists find themselves publishing hard copy the dilemmas, intrigues and moments of hysteria they face are varied, vast and inevitable.

Cast

Episodes

Production

Broadcast
The series was added to SABC3 streaming service Netflix season 1, 24 November 2020.

References

External links 
 
 
 

Television series about journalism
South African drama television series
SABC 3 original programming
2005 South African television series debuts
2016 South African television series endings
Television shows set in Johannesburg, South Africa